is a Japanese television series which was broadcast on Nippon Television from 16 April to 18 June 2005.

Synopsis
On Hatomi (a fictional name derived from Hatoma, the actual island where the drama was filmed), a small island in Okinawa state part of Japan's southern sea frontier, the social environment is suffering. With the last student of the elementary school leaving the place, the closing of the school is a virtual given. Mr. Nakama (Ken Ogata), decides to do something about it - and heads for Tokyo to recruit his grandson. Rebuffed by his daughter, however, he decides to adopt another child. He finds Ruri (Riko Narumi), a mature girl of 11 who distrusts people because her mother (Naomi Nishida) doesn't care much about her, but after seeing Mr. Nakama's true intentions, allows him to take her to the island. Unfortunately, the local teacher, Ms. Sanae (Manami Konishi), who was banking on the school's closing to be able to go somewhere else, is resentful of Ruri and makes light of her city fashion (including permed hair, fake curls, and miniskirts), which leads to a big showdown between her and Ruri - and the people who were enthusiastic about her suddenly begin to have their doubts, and only Mr. Nakama and his wife Megumi (Mitsuko Baisho) take Ruri's side strongly. Following into the island is Mr. Kawashima (Yutaka Takenouchi), a mysterious man who saves Ruri from drowning following the fight - and who becomes her conscience and friend in her daily life in the island. But is Kawashima what he seems? Or did he come to the island to run away from Tokyo - and possibly a crime he may have been involved in there? Katsumura and Nishiyama play a local married couple of neighbors, Kashu and Igawa a local unmarried couple of neighbors, all of them willing to help Ruri in their own way.

Cast
Riko Narumi as Ruri
Yutaka Takenouchi as Tatsuya/Makoto
Ken Ogata as Nakama Yuzou
Fumiyo Kohinata as Teruaki
Naomi Nishida as Nao
Taeko Yoshida as Granny Kamado
Sansei Shiomi as Souhei
Sei Hiraizumi as Harue
Yoshie Ichige as Yoshie
Sakura as Mihoko
Mitsuko Baisho as Megumi
Toshiki Kashu as Shigeru
Haruka Igawa as Mitsuki
Manami Konishi as Sanae
Ittoku Kishibe as Manabu
Masanobu Katsumura as Kouji
Mayuko Nishiyama as Natsumi
Anzu Nagai
Shunji Igarashi

Production credits
Screenwriters: Morishita Keiko, Terada Toshio, Morishita Nao (森下直), Takeda Yuki (武田有起)
Producers: Toda Kazuya (戸田一也), Kunimoto Masahiro, Tsugiya Hisashi (次屋尚)
Directors: Inomata Ryuuichi (猪股隆一), Ikeda Kenji (池田健司)
Music: Takefumi Haketa (羽毛田丈史)
Viewership: 12.64%

External links
Official Website
Dorama.info
JDorama.com
Discussion en Francais

Japanese drama television series
2005 Japanese television series debuts
2005 Japanese television series endings
Nippon TV dramas
Television shows set in Okinawa Prefecture